The Six Dollar Fifty Man is a short film (15 minutes) directed by Mark Albiston and Louis Sutherland and written by Sutherland.
The film premiered in the Short Film competition of Festival de Cannes in 2009 where it received Special Distinction. The Six Dollar Fifty Man tells the story of Andy, a gutsy 8-year-old boy who is forced to break out of his make-believe superhero world to deal with playground bullies. The title is a play on The Six Million Dollar Man.

Cast 
 Andy: Oscar Vandy-Connor
 Mary: Celina Russo-Bewick
 Mr Hannah: Nick Blake
 Mrs Rainer: Carmel McGlone
 Max: Thomas Kimber
 Jason: Sam Ahie
 School Kids: Te Horo and Raumati Beach Schools

Awards 
 Special Distinction - 62nd Festival De Cannes, France
 Coopers Award for Best Short Film - Flickerfest, Australia (1)
 Jury Prize in International Short Filmmaking - Sundance Film Festival, USA (1)
 Special Mention - 60th Internationale Filmfestspiele Berlin– Generation Kplus, Germany
 Best Drama - Aspen Shortsfest, USA (1)
 Best Narrative Short - 20th Annual Cinequest Film Festival, USA (1)
 Special Jury Award - NY Children's International Film Festival, USA
 Silver Spike – 55th Valladolid International Film Festival, Spain
 Best Narrative Short - Middle East International Film Festival, United Arab Emirates
 Best International Short Fiction Film - Expression en Corto, Mexico
 British Academy of Film and Television Arts (BAFTA), Los Angeles - Prize for Excellence - Aspen Shortsfest, USA
 Best Short Film - Magma Short Film Festival, N.Z.
 Best Short Film - Corto In Bra, Italy
 Best International Short Film - Dokufest, Kosovo
 Best Short Film - Vladivostok International Film Festival, Russia
 Best International Short Film - La Boca del Lobo Film Festival, Spain
 Best Short Film – 24fps International Short Film Festival, USA
 Best of Festival – St. Louis Film Festival, USA
 Audience Award, International Competition - ‘Sequence’ Toulouse Short Film Festival, France

(1) Academy Qualifying Awards

References

External links 
 http://www.nzfilm.co.nz/FilmCatalogue/Films/The_Six_Dollar_Fifty_Man.aspx
 http://www.festival-cannes.fr/en/archives/ficheFilm/id/10907395.html
 http://history.sundance.org/films/6628
 https://www.imdb.com/title/tt1450762/

2009 short films
Short Film Palme d'Or winners
New Zealand short films
2009 films